Estrone methyl ether, or estrone 3-methyl ether, is a synthetic estrogen and estrogen ether – specifically, the C3 methyl ether of estrone – which was never marketed. It has been used to synthesize mestranol (ethinylestradiol 3-methyl ether).

See also
 List of estrogen esters § Ethers of steroidal estrogens

References

Abandoned drugs
Estranes
Estrogen ethers
Ketones
Synthetic estrogens